{{Infobox audio drama
|title=Invasion of the Daleks
|publisher=Big Finish Productions
|series=Dalek Empire
|number=1
|cover=Invasion_of_the_Daleks.jpg
|writer=Nicholas Briggs
|director=Nicholas Briggs
|producer=Jason Haigh-ElleryNicholas Briggs
|set_between=before The Human Factor
|length=70 minutes
|}}Invasion of the Daleks is a Big Finish Productions audio drama based on the long-running British science fiction television series Doctor Who.

 Plot 
The Daleks begin their invasion of the galaxy with an attack on the peaceful Earth Alliance colony of Vega VI.

Cast
Susan Mendes – Sarah Mowat
Alby Brook – Mark McDonnell
Kalendorf – Gareth Thomas
Pellan – John Wadmore
Narrator – Joyce Gibbs
Admiral Cheviat – Ian Brooker
Ed Byers – Ian Brooker
Roboman – Ian Brooker
Tanlee – Nicholas Briggs (credited as David Sax)
Dalek Voices – Nicholas BriggsAlistair Lock

Continuity
Kalendorf is a Knight of Velyshaa. Another member of the Knights, Sancroff, appeared in the audio adventure The Sirens of Time.
The Daleks prepared for their endeavours in this spin-off series.  These preparations were heard in four previous Doctor Who audio stories. Those stories were part of the Dalek Empire arc with the Seventh Doctor (The Genocide Machine), the Sixth Doctor (The Apocalypse Element), the Fifth Doctor (The Mutant Phase) and the Eighth Doctor (The Time of the Daleks'').

External links
Big Finish Productions – Invasion of the Daleks

Invasion of the Daleks
Audio plays by Nicholas Briggs